Lanji tehsil is a fourth-order administrative and revenue division, a subdivision of third-order administrative and revenue division of Balaghat district of Madhya Pradesh. It includes the Lanji village.

Geography
Lanji tehsil has an area of 764.68 sq kilometers. It is bounded by Maharashtra in the south, southwest and west, Kirnapur tehsil in the northwest, Baihar tehsil in the north and Chhattisgarh in the northeast, east and southeast.

Culture 
The population of Lanji mostly speak Hindibut includes many other, including the Marathi& Chhattisgarhi. Lanji is a village with a rich culture and civilisation. Through Lanji History it has hosted many people coming from East (Chhattisgarh), South (Maharashtra) and North ( North Madhya Pradesh). All those civilisations have affected the social structure of Lanji

Economy

Agriculture 
There is sufficient rainfall in the Lanji region for purely Agriculture. The main agricultural crop is rice. floating rice. Seed is sown at the beginning of the rainy season (June–July).

Education

Schools 
 
Government Model Higher Secondary School Lanji
Saket Public School Lanji
Central India Academy Lanji
Pali Academic Institution, Bisoni,  Lanji

See also 
Balaghat district
Hina Kaware
Bhagwat Bhau Nagpure

Citations

External links

Tehsils of Madhya Pradesh
Balaghat district